Vincent George Batchelor (17 February 1900 – 4 September 1981) was an Australian rules footballer who played with Collingwood in the Victorian Football League (VFL).

He is the father of VFL footballer Keith Vincent Batchelor (1930-2009).

Notes

External links 

Vin Batchelor's profile at Collingwood Forever

1900 births
1981 deaths
Australian rules footballers from Melbourne
Collingwood Football Club players